was a town located in Shikama District, Hyōgo Prefecture, Japan. It actually is a group of 44 small islands (4 main inhabited ones and 40 smaller uninhabited ones) about 18 kilometers off the coast of Himeji and Akō. Ieshima is one of the big islands but the name Ieshima is also used to refer to the entire chain of Islands.

On March 27, 2006, the towns Ieshima, Yumesaki (also from Shikama District), Yasutomi (Shisō District), and Kōdera (Kanzaki District) were merged into the expanded city of Himeji and are no longer independent municipalities.

Main islands
Ieshima (家島): 5.46 km², about 4,000 inhabitants
Bozejima (坊勢島): 1.87 km², about 4,000 inhabitants
Nishijima (西島): 6.59 km², about 100 inhabitants
Tangajima (男鹿島): 4.57 km², about 150 inhabitants

Most of the population lives on Ieshima and Bozejima. Ieshima is divided into 2 "hamlets" called Miya and Maura. The two main industries of Ieshima are fishing and quarrying. Tangajima and Nishijima have been quarried for at least 400 years and supplied stones used in the building of Osaka Castle. The eastern part of Nishijima is maintained as a camping and recreation ground by Hyogo Prefecture. Ieshima is host to the annual Open Water Swim Competition which has been rapidly gaining fame as one of the most popular open water swim competitions in Japan. The race takes place between the islands of Tangajima and Ieshima.

Transport
Ieshima and Bozejima can be reached by a 35-minute boat ride from Himeji Port.

Climate

Gallery

References

External links
Official website in Japanese
Website for Ieshima Nature Learning Center in Japanese
Information in English about how to get there and things to see 

Dissolved municipalities of Hyōgo Prefecture
Archipelagoes of Japan
Islands of Hyōgo Prefecture
Archipelagoes of the Pacific Ocean